Hartert's double-eyed fig parrot (Cyclopsitta diophthalma virago) is a subspecies of the double-eyed fig parrot. It is native to the Fergusson and Goodenough islands (D'Entrecasteaux Islands, Papua New Guinea).

Description
It has a dark green back and light green body. The male has red facial markings while the female has a red and blue cap.

References

Cyclopsitta
Birds of New Guinea
D'Entrecasteaux Islands